Pagla Jame Mosque,, known locally as Raypur Boro Mosque,, is a mosque in the village of Raypur, Paschim Pagla, South Sunamganj, Sunamganj District, Bangladesh. It lies on the banks of the Mahashing River. It was built by a local businessman called Yasin Mirza. The Daily Star has called the mosque one of the district's best tourist destinations.

History
After travelling and admiring buildings around the subcontinent, in particular Calcutta, a local businessman named Yasin Mirza decided to build a mosque in his local village of Raypur. Groundbreaking took place in 1924 and construction in 1931. It took 10 years to complete. Yasin Mirza hired architects and builders from cities of the British Raj such as Calcutta and Delhi. The main architect was Mumin Astagar, a descendant of one of the architects of the Taj Mahal. During this period, Mumin was living in Dacca.

Description 
It is a two-storey building. In front of the building is a large eidgah. There is a gate on the north side. The building has three domes.

Gallery

References

Architecture in Bangladesh
Islamic architecture
Buildings and structures in Sylhet Division
Sunamganj District
Historic sites in Bangladesh
Mosques in Bangladesh
Mosques completed in 1941
Mosque buildings with domes